Bílov is a municipality and village in Plzeň-North District in the Plzeň Region of the Czech Republic. It has about 80 inhabitants.

History
The first written mention of Bílov is from 1299, when it was owned by the monastery is Plasy. The village was probably established around 1200 and named after its probable founder, lokator Biel, whose existence was documented in 1197.

References

Villages in Plzeň-North District